Jayapataka Swami; born on April 9, 1949) is a Vaishnava swami and a religious leader for the International Society for Krishna Consciousness (ISKCON). He is a senior disciple of A. C. Bhaktivedanta Swami Prabhupada. In 2004 he was one of the initiating spiritual masters, (ISKCON Gurus), a member of the Governing Body Commission (GBC), and a divisional trustee for the Bhaktivedanta Book Trust (BBT). He is one of the senior-most sannyasis in the Hare Krishna movement.

Honorifics
 His Holiness
 Maharaja
 Guru

Early years
Jayapataka Swami was born in Milwaukee, Wisconsin as Gordon John Erdman II to Gordon John Erdman and Lorraine Erdman (Golich). He attended St. John's Northwestern Military Academy and Brown University. There, as a fresh enrollee, he was influenced by a guest lecture on the life of Buddha that he lost all interest in his studies and began searching for a spiritual teacher. After some time of searching he concluded he would have to go to India to find his teacher.

Before leaving for India, Gordon came across some Hare Krishna devotees, doing kirtan and distributing Back To Godhead magazine. Shortly after he visited the San Francisco ISKCON center, where he met Jayananda das who introduced him to the Ratha Yatra. His first service in ISKCON was to help build the Ratha Cart. From there he travelled to Montreal, Quebec, Canada where he met Srila Prabhupada. John took first initiation in Montreal, Quebec, Canada and was given the name 'Jayapataka dasa'. Soon after he was awarded 2nd initiation in New York.

While in Montreal, Jayapataka dasa was engaged in the service of printing books and dispatching them to other ISKCON temples around the world. Later, on the instruction of Srila Prabhupada, Jayapataka went to Toronto to open a temple there. When Jayapataka dasa took over the Toronto center as president he wrote to Srila Prabhupada enquiring about his service and was told by him to go to India.

References

External links
Jayapataka Swami's Official Website

Converts to Hinduism
International Society for Krishna Consciousness religious figures
1949 births
Living people
Indian Hare Krishnas
Indian Hindu monks
Brown University alumni
Religious leaders from Milwaukee
20th-century Hindu religious leaders
21st-century Hindu religious leaders